Rahul is a popular male name in India and has a variety of meanings. The earliest meaning found in the Upanishads is "conqueror of all miseries." Later use of the word is attributed to the Buddha, who named his son Rahula as he felt that family ties could be an obstacle in the path to renunciation and nirvana. Buddha uttered Rahul when he first saw his son and gave a new meaning "relationship" and "bondage" to this name. Rahul means Moon, Able/efficient in Sanskrit and Pali. Rahul also means "Traveler" in Arabic.

People named Rahul

Personalities in the fields of Arts 
 Rahul Banerjee (actor) (born 1983), Indian Bengali actor
 Rahul Bhatt (born 1982), Indian fitness trainer and actor
 Rahul Bose (born 1967), Indian Bengali actor, director, screenwriter, social activist
 Rahul Deshpande (born 1979), Indian classical singer
 Rahul Dev (born 1968), Indian actor and model
 Rahul Dev Burman (1939–1994), Indian composer and music director
 Rahul Dholakia, Indian film director, producer, and screenwriter
 Rahul Khanna (born 1972), Indian Hindi actor
 Rahul Madhav, Indian Malayalam actor
 Rahul Nambiar, Indian singer
 Rahul Pandey, Indian Bollywood musician
 Rahul Raj (born 1980), Indian composer
 Rahul Ram, Indian musician
 Rahul Ramakrishna (born 1991), Indian actor, writer and journalist
 Rahul Rawail (born 1951), Indian film director
 Rahul Roy (born 1968), Indian Hindi actor, producer and model
 Rahul Vaidya (born 1987), Indian singer
 Rrahul Sudhir, Indian television actor

Personalities in Politics 
 Rahul Daulatrao Aher (born 1975), Indian politician from Maharashtra
 Rahul Gandhi (born 1970), Indian politician
 Rahul Mahajan (politician) (born 1975), son of Late Pramod Mahajan, a prominent Indian politician

Personalities in the fields of Science 
 Rahul Mukerjee (born 1956), Indian academic and statistician
 Rahul Pandit (born 1956), Indian  physicist
 Rahul Potluri (born 1983), Indian-British physician and researcher
 Rahul Sarpeshkar, American bio-engineer

Personalities in Sports 
 Rahul Banerjee (archer) (born 1986), Indian archer
 Rahul Bheke (born 1990), Indian footballer
 Rahul Chahar (born 1999), Indian cricketer
 Rahul Dravid (born 1973), Indian cricketer
 K. L. Rahul (born 1991), Indian cricketer
 Rahul Kanwat (born 1974), Indian cricketer
 Rahul Sanghvi (born 1974), Indian cricketer
 Rahul Yadav (cricketer) (born 1989), Indian cricketer
 Rahul Yadav Chittaboina (born 1998), Indian badminton player
 Rahul KP (born 2000), Indian footballer

Other personalities 
 Rahul Bajaj (born 1980), industrialist
 Rahul Chandran (born 1976), policy analyst
 Rahul Easwar, Indian author and activist
 Rahul Ligma, fictional ex-employee of Twitter played by an amateur actor
 Rahul Mahajan (blogger), noted American blogger and author
 Rahul Roushan (born 1980), Indian journalist and strategist
 Rahul Roy (accountant) (1963–2009), Indian accountant
 Rahul Sankrityayan (1893–1963), Indian historian, religious scholar, philosopher, writer and polymath
 Rahul Sood (born 1973), Canadian business executive
 Rahul Yadav (born 1988), Indian entrepreneur

Others 
 Rahul Kumar (disambiguation), several people
 Rahul Prasad (disambiguation), several people
 Rahul Sharma (disambiguation), several people
 Rahul Singh (disambiguation), several people

Awards named with Rahul
Mahapandit Rahul Sankrityayan Award is a Literary award in India

Movies with the name Rahul
 Rahul's Arranged Marriage (2005)
 Rahul (2001)

References

See also
 Rahula (disambiguation)
 Raul (disambiguation)
 Raoul (disambiguation)
 Rasul (disambiguation)

Indian masculine given names